William Vincent Jephson (6 October 1873 – 12 November 1956) was an English cricketer. Jephson was a right-handed batsman who played occasionally as a wicket-keeper.

Jephson made his first-class debut for Hampshire in the 1903 County Championship against Derbyshire. Jephson played 57 first-class matches for Hampshire, 56 before the First World War, with his final match for Hampshire coming against Middlesex in 1919. In his 57 matches for Hampshire, Jephson scored 1,571 runs at a batting average of 16.89, with six half centuries and a high score of 90 against Worcestershire in 1903. Jephson took 36 catches and made a single stumping. Jephson additionally played a single first-class match for Hambledon in a commemorative match against an England XI in 1908. During the match, Jephson scored his maiden and only first-class century with a score of 114*.

In 1908 Jephson played his first match for the Marylebone Cricket Club against Yorkshire. Jephson played 4 matches for the club, with his final match coming against Nottinghamshire in 1920. Jephson scored 92 runs at an average of 11.50, with a high score of 63 against the Australian Imperial Forces in 1919. In 1920 Jephson joined Dorset, making his debut for the county in the 1920 Minor Counties Championship against the Kent Second XI. Jephson played 30 Minor Counties matches for Dorset, with his final match for the county coming against Devon in 1925.

Jephson died at Monkton Combe, Somerset on 12 November 1956.

External links

1873 births
1956 deaths
People from Welwyn Hatfield (district)
English cricketers
Hampshire cricketers
Marylebone Cricket Club cricketers
Dorset cricketers